Hienadz Buraukin (28 August 1936 – 30 May 2014) was a Belarusian poet, journalist and diplomat.

Biography 
He was born in the village Shuliacina in Vitebsk Region. In 1959, he graduated from the Belarusian State University.

During his career, he was chief reporter of the Soviet state newspaper Pravda in Belarus. In 1969, he helped Zianon Pazniak to publish several articles on preservation of architectural heritage of Belarus.

From 1972 to 1978, Buraukin was chief editor of the Belarus-wide magazine Maladosts, where he published numerous works of Vasil Bykaŭ and Uladzimir Karatkievich. Being member of the parliament from 1980 to 1990, he was one of the promoters of a law that improved the status of the Belarusian language in BSSR.

From 1978 to 1990, he was chief of State Television and Radio-company of Belarus, but was dismissed from the position for granting broadcasting possibilities for members of the democratic opposition.

From 1990 till 1994, Buraukin was accredited Permanent Representative of Belarus to the United Nations. In the 1990s, Buraukin was also head of the Francišak Skaryna Belarusian Language Society.

Buraukin died from cancer on 30 May 2014 in Minsk at the age of 77.

Literary work and awards 
Buraukin was the author of numerous poetic books. Many of his poems became lyrics for songs, including a famous lullaby. For his literature works, he was awarded the Leninist Comsomol Preium of Belarus (1972) and the Janka Kupala State Literature Premium (1980).

References 
 

1936 births
2014 deaths
20th-century Belarusian poets
20th-century Belarusian writers
20th-century translators
People from Rasony District
Communist Party of the Soviet Union members
Belarusian State University alumni
Members of the Central Committee of the Communist Party of Byelorussia
Members of the Supreme Soviet of the Byelorussian SSR (1980–1985)
Members of the Supreme Soviet of the Byelorussian SSR (1985–1990)
Permanent Representatives of Belarus to the United Nations
Recipients of the Byelorussian SSR State Prize
Recipients of the Order of Friendship of Peoples
Recipients of the Order of the Red Banner of Labour
Magazine editors
Newspaper editors
Belarusian diplomats
Belarusian journalists
Belarusian language activists
Belarusian male poets
Belarusian male writers
Belarusian screenwriters
Belarusian songwriters
Belarusian translators
Soviet children's writers
Soviet diplomats
Ambassador Extraordinary and Plenipotentiary (Soviet Union)
Soviet editors
Soviet journalists
Soviet male poets
Soviet screenwriters
Soviet songwriters
Soviet translators
Deaths from cancer in Belarus